Climbing hydrangea is a common name for several species in the genus Hydrangea, and also of related species in other genera:

Decumaria barbara
Hydrangea anomala
Hydrangea hydrangeoides
Hydrangea petiolaris
Pileostegia viburnoides

See also
 Hydrangea serratifolia a climbing species from Chile